People's Artist of Ukraine is an honorary and the highest title awarding to outstanding performing artists whose merits are exceptional in the sphere of the development of the performing arts (theatre, music, dance, circus, cinema, etc.).

Established in 1922 during Soviet times, it was technically called People's Artist of the Ukrainian SSR (Народний артист УРСР). With the establishment of independent Ukraine, this tradition was kept and the title was renamed as People's Artist of Ukraine (Народний артист України). 
 
Its recipients include many of the most highly acclaimed composers, dancers, singers, musicians, film and theatre directors, actors, circus performers, etc.

During Soviet times, a person was usually named People's Artist only after reaching the age of 40. Exceptions were made for ballet artists.

In 2005 the vocalist of the Ukrainian band Vopli Vidplyasova Oleh Skrypka refused to accept the title.

There also is another honorary title, the Distinguished Artist of Ukraine («Заслужений артист України»), which is considered less important.  Typically, the People's Artist award is given at least 10 years after one has earned the Distinguished Artist of Ukraine award.

List of selected recipients

People's Painter of Ukraine 
 Kateryna Vasylivna Bilokur
 Liudmyla Zhogol
 Volodymyr Patyk

Theatre, cinema 
Just some of those awarded the honorary title in the fields of cinema and theatre are:
 Lidiya Belozyorova — actress
 Volodymyr Bortko — film director, screenwriter, actor, producer
 Borislav Brondukov — actor
 Mykola Hrynko — actor
 Kirill Lavrov - actor
 Kira Muratova — film director, screenwriter, actress
 Viktor Stepanov — Soviet, Ukrainian and Russian actor
 Oleh Fialko — Ukrainian film director and screenwriter
 Yuri Ilyenko — Soviet and Ukrainian film director and screenwriter

Dance
Some of those awarded the honorary title in the field of dance are:
 Tatiana Stepanova – Prima Ballerina
 Alexandr Stoyanov - ballet dancer
 German Isupov – Choreographer and Ballet Master

Music
Some of those awarded the honorary title in the field of music are:
 Ani Lorak- pop singer
 Anatoliy Avdiyevsky - conductor
 Serhiy Bashtan (1995) - bandurist
 Oleksandr Bilash - composer
 Ihor Bilozir - compositor, pop singer
 Oksana Bilozir - pop singer
 Andriy Bobyr - bandurist
 Viktor Hutsal - conductor
 Ivan Kuchuhura Kucherenko (1918) and (1925) - kobzar
 Nina Matviyenko - folk singer
 Romanna Vasylevych - banduristka
 Yuliy Meitus - composer
 Ruslana - pop singer, Eurovision Song Contest winner
 Sofia Rotaru - pop-singer, actress (alto)
 Volodymyr Yesypok (2007) - bandurist
 Taras Petrynenko (1999)
 Jamala (2016) - singer, songwriter, the winner of Eurovision 2016
 Tina Karol (2017) - singer
 Verka Serduchka (2003) - singer, second place on Eurovision Song Contest
 Alla Kudlai - singer

Circus

Foreigners
 Philipp Kirkorov - 2008 - singer
 Nikolay Baskov — opera and pop-singer (tenor)
 Sargis Paradzhanov — Soviet, Ukrainian, Armenian and Georgian film director and screenwriter.
 Mikhail Zhvanetsky — writer of comic sketches, among other things
 Hobart Earle - 2013 - American, long-time maestro of the Odessa Philharmonic

See also
 Honorary titles of Ukraine
 Merited Artist of Ukraine
 People's Artist of the USSR
 People's Artist
 List of European art awards

References

Ukrainian art awards
 
Performing arts in Ukraine
Ukraine
Honorary titles of Ukraine